The Federation of Neighborhood Councils-El Alto (FEJUVE) is a federalist mode of political organization of over 600 neighborhood councils that provide public services, construction and jobs to citizens of El Alto, Bolivia.

El Alto's neighborhood councils and its self-managed informal economy are based on a fusion of the traditional organization of the indigenous Aymara and Quechua people, as well as the syndicalism brought by the radical miners that settled in the city during the 1980s.

History

Background
During the Bolivian National Revolution of 1952, the government of Víctor Paz Estenssoro redistributed land to peasants from the highlands, providing financial support to lowland farms that were dedicated to commercial agriculture. The indigenous peoples in Bolivia, who largely practiced traditional methods of farming, eventually found themselves unable to compete with the cheap food that was imported into the country, following the economic restructuring programs of the neoliberal era. The government shutdown many of the country's mines and small farms, leading to thousands of miners being displaced and large sections of the peasantry being expelled from Altiplano, with many of them settling in the small town of El Alto.

The small town quickly became a major urban center, with over 850,000 residents, largely made up of indigenous Aymara and Quechua people. The Bolivian state had little presence in the city, leaving its residents without infrastructure like paved roads, waste management or telephone networks, and even without basic necessities such as running water and electricity. Three quarters of the city's residents had no access to healthcare and nearly half of them were not literate. 70% of the population earned a living from small family businesses, forming a city-wide informal economy that has only expanded since the implementation of neoliberalism.

Foundation
In response to the widespread poverty, corruption and violence in El Alto, during the 1950s, the city's residents started to form their first self-organized neighborhood councils, based on the traditional practices of the local Aymara people. In 1957, the first council was established in order to provide a program of universal basic services for the new residents. The councils increasingly coordinated with each other and, by 1979, had united together into a federation, establishing the Federation of Neighborhood Councils (FEJUVE). In 1994, the government of Gonzalo Sánchez de Lozada passed the Law of Popular Participation, which devolved a fifth of the national budget to local municipalities, giving local communities a participatory role in budgeting and urban planning. This new law increased the FEJUVE's influence significantly, with neighborhood councils beginning to function as the de facto local governments, subverting the influence of state governance.

The councils provided the means for residents of El Alto to develop their own communities, without state intervention. Residents pooled their resources and skills within the neighborhood councils, securing the purchase of land, the construction of schools and public parks, and the installation of utility services. The councils also acted as the de facto regulation authority in the city, overseeing property transactions, mediating disputes between neighbors and establishing a form of community justice that has resulted in El Alto's relatively low crime rate. FEJUVE has also acted to mobilize their neighborhoods in protest against the government: leading the movement for the establishment of the Public University of El Alto in 1998; preventing the implementation of a tax on home construction in 2003; and putting an end to water privatization in 2005.

Conflict
During the Bolivian gas conflict, the infrastructure that FEJUVE had already built provided a means for El Alto's citizens to resist the government. 

The local culture of collective identity, tied closely to both the neighborhood councils and the residents' original communities in Altiplano, linked urban and rural communities together. Despite peasant roadblocks causing food shortages and inflation in El Alto, urban residents maintained their solidarity with the peasantry. The conflict also ignited a reconciliation of indigenous struggles with the trade union movement, as both the indigenous peasant and mining cultures of El Alto reinforced each-other, with elements of the two converging into a collective resistance. A general strike shut down El Alto, with thousands mobilizing in popular demonstrations. A sense of collective responsibility, inherited from the practices of the Ayllu, encouraged a high level of popular participation in neighborhood campaigns, through a system of both individual benefits and penalties. 

The grassroots organizing of the resistance was strengthened by traditional practices of direct democracy, with horizontally-organized assemblies utilizing consensus decision-making to facilitate collective action. The neighborhood councils organized roadblocks, social kitchens and community self-defense, rotating shifts in order to keep the protest going continuously. Councils also worked together with the trade unions to facilitate access to markets and roads for the local populace. The FEJUVE itself did not lead the events, as it was guided by the indigenous principle of "leading by obeying". One FEJUVE leader noted of the protest movement:

Neighborhood councils did seize control of resources, territory and infrastructure from the government, which provided El Alto with a high degree of autonomy from the state. The FEJUVE organized a blockade of La Paz, effectively placing the capital under siege, even shutting down the airport to cut the city off from the world. The autonomy achieved during the conflict has been compared to dual power, implemented earlier by the soviets during the Russian Revolution, but FEJUVE nevertheless refused to seize state power, instead laying the groundwork for a broader political shift that culminated in the election of Evo Morales in 2005.

Socialist period 

The government of Evo Morales and the Movement for Socialism (MAS) was brought to power by the promise to implement the "October Agenda", proposed by social movements including the FEJUVE, which would reintroduce popular sovereignty over natural resources and reconstitute the Bolivian state along the lines of plurinationalism. But the efforts of the government to implement this were frustrated by the country's integration in the globalized economy and decades of neoliberalism. The nationalization of oil supplies was met with cutbacks in private investment, agribusiness restricted agrarian reform to the redistribution of already publicly-held lands, while the new plurinational constitution was stonewalled by the right-wing representatives of the Media Luna. 

FEJUVE found itself caught between its own autonomy and the new left-wing government, when a number of its leaders became members of the government, leading some to question whether the Federation remained independent or if it had been coopted by the MAS. The former FEJUVE leader Julieta Mabel Monje received particular criticism for her role as the Minister of Environment and Water, due to her mismanagement of the return of El Alto's water supply from private to public ownership. FEJUVE had proposed the new public water company be self-managed through participatory democracy, but the local government rejected this proposition. 

The government further rejected FEJUVE's proposal to elect the Constituent Assembly on a non-partisan basis, with delegates elected from ethnic, trade union and neighborhood lists, rather than from political parties. The MAS succeeded in consolidating power over the popular movements and demobilizing them, with the FEJUVE finding itself "unable to mobilize its bases effectively to advance the cause of the city’s indigenous informal proletarian masses". However, with the outbreak of the 2008 unrest, neighborhood councils in Santa Cruz formed to defend their neighborhoods from the rising right-wing paramilitary violence, inspired directly by the FEJUVE. A coalition of social movements even placed Santa Cruz under siege, with FEJUVE and Morales leading a demonstration on a march to the capital, demanding the National Congress convoke of a constitutional referendum. The new constitution was finally ratified after a number of concessions to the opposition, thus maintaining the influence of agribusiness and keeping power in the hands of political parties. Despite the anti-capitalist and directly democratic elements of the constitution being struck out, its ratification still implemented the state ownership of natural resources and the expansion of indigenous rights. 

To mobilize support for the constitution, the FEJUVE came together with other social movements to found the National Coalition for Change (CONAL-CAM), working together with the Bolivian Workers' Center (COB) as part of a popular front. The FEJUVE had found itself undergoing a shift from its former confrontational position to a "constructive but critical collaboration" with the MAS government. The FEJUVE's collaboration with the government has since resulted in a new public housing program for El Alto, with the FEJUVE and COR pushing for the integration of participatory planning into the process. The Ministry of Production and Microenterprise has also provided support for El Alto's social enterprises, which are organized along the traditional lines of participatory democracy. This process resulted in the extension of workers' control over the economy, with FEJUVE and COR arguing for the program's expansion to El Alto's smaller businesses. This new model of "Andean capitalism" intended to utilize surplus funds from nationalized resources to promote community self-organization and workers' self-management.

Government 
As of 2008, FEJUVE counted 570 neighborhood councils spread throughout El Alto's nine districts. Each council has at least 200 members, which elect their own leadership committees and hold monthly neighborhood assemblies, which make decisions through discussion and consensus. Political party leaders, merchants, real estate speculators, and those who collaborated with the dictatorship are not allowed to be delegates between councils. Leadership of the neighborhood councils also have a relatively high proportion of women, around 20-30%.

Economy 
The informal economy of El Alto is self-managed by the city's workers and small traders. Market vendors are represented by a street merchants' association, which regulates stall access, keeps track of the markets' upkeep and sanitation, mediates inter-vendor disputes and negotiates with the municipal government on the vendors' behalf. Taxi and bus drivers are similarly organized within a trade union, which regulates their routes and allocates their itineraries. El Alto's trade union federation, which has a powerful role in the city's economy, cooperates closely with the FEJUVE on key issues.

References

Bibliography

Further reading

External links
News about FEJUVE on eaBolivia
News about FEJUVE on eju!
News about FEJUVE on El Alto Digital
News about FEJUVE on El Diario
News about FEJUVE on Los Tiempos
News about FEJUVE on Página Siete

1979 establishments in Bolivia
Anarchism in Bolivia
Community-building organizations
Indigenous organisations in Bolivia
Indigenous politics in South America
La Paz Department (Bolivia)
Organisations based in Bolivia
Organizations established in 1979
Neighborhood associations
Urban planning organizations